Omorgus amictus is a beetle of the Family Trogidae found in Australia.

References 

Beetles of Australia
amictus
Beetles described in 1854